{{Infobox boxing match
| fight date = 26 February 2022
| Fight Name = Josh Taylor vs Jack Catterall
| image =
| location = OVO Hydro, Glasgow, Scotland
| titles = WBA (Super), WBC, IBF, WBO, and The Ring light-welterweight titles
| fighter1 = Josh Taylor
| nickname1 = The Tartan Tornado
| record1 = 18–0 (13 KOs)
| hometown1 = Prestonpans, Scotland
| height1 = 5 ft 10 in
| weight1 = 140 lb
| style1 = Southpaw
| recognition1 = WBA (Super), WBC, IBF, WBO, and The Ring light-welterweight champion[[The Ring (magazine)|The Ring]] No. 5 ranked pound-for-pound fighter
| fighter2 = Jack Catterall
| nickname2 = El Gato (The Cat)
| record2 = 26–0 (13 KOs)
| hometown2 = Chorley, England
| height2 = 5 ft 7 in
| weight2 = 139 lb
| style2 = Orthodox
| recognition2 =
| result =  Taylor wins via split decision (112-113, 114-111, 113-112)
}}

Josh Taylor vs Jack Catterall was a professional boxing match contested between undisputed light-welterweight champion, Josh Taylor, and the WBO's mandatory challenger, Jack Catterall. The event took place on 26 February 2022, at the OVO Hydro in Glasgow. Whilst Taylor was awarded a decision victory, the true result of the fight was highly debated.

Background
In January 2019, Catterall was installed as the number one challenger to WBO champion Maurice Hooker. After Hooker lost his title in a unification fight against WBC champion José Ramírez in July, the WBO ordered Ramírez to face Catterall in a mandatory defence. However, the WBC also ordered Ramírez to face their mandatory challenger, Viktor Postol. Ramírez chose to fight Postol with the agreement that the winner face Catterall next. Less than 48 hours after Ramírez defeated Postol in August 2020, he was again ordered to face Catterall next. In October, Catterall had confirmed that he agreed to a "step-aside" deal to allow Ramírez to face unified WBA (Super), IBF, and The Ring'' champion, Josh Taylor, for the undisputed light-welterweight title, again with the agreement that Catterall face the winner next.

Taylor defeated Ramírez via unanimous decision on 22 May 2021. Days after his victory, Taylor said of Catterall, "Jack Catterall was decent enough to let me do this fight first. He's been mandatory for some time. He agreed to step aside to let this fight happen. You can see his point, there's method in his madness. If that fight's next, he's got the chance to become undisputed champion. He's made a good choice."

In August, ESPN reported that terms had been agreed between Taylor and Catterall to meet on 18 December at the OVO Hydro in Glasgow. It was announced by Taylor on 21 October that he had suffered an injury, and thus the fight would be postponed to 26 February 2022.  

A few details on the undercard were announced late January which includes a ten round bout between Robeisy Ramirez and Eric Donovan. A recent new signing from Top Rank will host a debut match for Kieran Molloy against an opponent yet to be named.

Fight card

References

Boxing matches
2022 in boxing
2022 in Scottish sport
February 2022 sports events in the United Kingdom
Sports competitions in Glasgow
2020s in Glasgow